God Hears Pleas of the Innocent is the sixth album by Killdozer, released in 1995. It was the band's final album. "Pour Man" is a cover of the Lee Hazlewood song.

Critical reception
The Washington Post wrote that "such tunes as 'The Buzzard' and 'Big Song of Hell' suggest an alternate universe where Black Sabbath taught Robert Johnson how to play the blues, rather than the other way around." The Wisconsin State Journal deemed the album "another outrageously heavy slab of sludge-grunge." 

The Chicago Tribune determined that Killdozer is "still uproariously brutish, raucous, heavy and slow, and it still thankfully sounds like it records down a dirt road in the company of several dozen mysteriously buried corpses." The Philadelphia Inquirer called God Hears Pleas of the Innocent "an offering of thick, sludgy rock and roll for the working man (and woman), and a rare mix of social consciousness with a sense of humor."

Track listing

Personnel
Killdozer
Michael Gerald – vocals, bass guitar
Dan Hobson – drums
Paul Zagoras – guitar
Production and additional personnel
Steve Albini – production, engineering, mixing
Killdozer – production, mixing

References

External links 
 

1995 albums
Albums produced by Steve Albini
Killdozer (band) albums
Touch and Go Records albums